Zulfiqar Ali Bhatti is an engineer turned educationist, poet and academic author from Sindh, Pakistan. He has written more than two hundred books including several textbooks in Sindhi, Urdu, and English Language.

Ali Bhatti received his engineering degree from Sindh Agriculture University and then Masters in English Literature from University of Sindh. His poems and articles appear in different newspapers.

Ali Bhatti has authored more than two hundred books which have also been kept on exhibitions. His major publications include Unshed Tears, 
Yadgar Dictionary of Computer Terms, Fundamentals of English Grammar, and Khofnak Sazish, a children's novel.

References 

Sindhi people
Sindhi-language poets
Writers from Sindh
Pakistani poets
Sindhi-language writers
1971 births
Living people